ʿAin Ebel, the ancient 'En Bol,  is a village located in the Lebanese Upper Galilee in the Caza of Bint Jbeil in the Nabatiye Governorate in Lebanon.

Etymology

Historian Taissier Khalaf writes that the name of the town means "Spring of the Monk" because in Aramaic Ain means spring and Ebel means the hermit, who wears a monk's garb. While Anis Freiha and Friar Youakim Moubarak believe that Ebel is a corruption of the word Baal, in reference to the  Semitic god associated with storms and thus irrigation, and combined with Ain then the name may mean the "Spring of Irrigation". Edward Henry Palmer, in 1881, wrote that it meant "The Spring of Camels" taking a literal translation for the name from classical Arabic.

Variation of Spelling

Due to the different standards in the Romanization of Arabic, the spelling of the name of the village has sometimes varied, such as Ainebel, Aïn Ebel, Ain Ebl, Ain Ibl, ‘Ayn Ibil, ‘Ain Ibil, Aïn Ibel, and Ain Ibel.

History

Ain Ebel is a historic village with numerous archaeological sites.

Prehistory
Lower Paleolithic implements were found in Ain Ebel, and historian believe that prehistoric man lived and hunted in the area from the most ancient times. A Heavy Neolithic site of the Qaraoun culture was discovered by Henri Fleisch west of Ain Ebel in the Wadi Koura, with tools found suggested to be part of a forest dweller's toolkit at the start of the Neolithic Revolution.  The region stretching from the north of Ain Ebel to south near Yaroun is rich in flint instruments, and the whole surrounding region as far as Jish contains megalithic ruins, perhaps pre-Canaanites.

Ancient History
In the Babylonian Talmud, Ain Ebel is referred to as 'En Bol, and identified as a village northwest of Safed, where minorities practiced a  form of niddah in which female infants were made to undergo the ritual immersion before their mothers.

Historian John T. Durward argues that Ain Ebel, located west of Kedesh of Naphtali (an ancient town documented in Judges 4:6, 10), is probably the biblical town of Beth Maacah, and was the spiritual retreat of the clergy from Tyre and Acre.

On the outskirts of the village is an area called Chalaboune where Ernest Renan, a French historian and philosopher who was sent by Emperor Napoleon III to Lebanon, found ancient graves.  According to Renan, Ain-Ebel had beautiful underground passages and large buildings in colossal stones and admirable carved sarcophagi in two remarkable places, Douair and Chalaboune, which he believed was the Biblical town of Shaalabbin of the Tribe of Dan. On one of the graves, Renan discovered a bas-relief of Apollo and Artemis.  The relief was transported to France where it remains today at the Louvre.  In 2011 and after months of negotiation, the Musée du Louvre agreed to make an exact replica of the bas-relief, which was delivered to the municipality of Ain Ebel in November.

Modern History

It is believed that the village has been continuously inhabited at least since the 15th century when Christians from the north of Lebanon migrated to lower elevations in the south to cultivate feudal lands.

In his book, Salut Jerusalem: Les memoires d'un chretien de Tyr a l'epoque des Croisades, the Lebanese historian, Bechara Menassa, wrote that the people of Ain Ebel were in touch with the Crusaders in Toron, modern Tebnine. Menassa described how a Frankish monk killed a wild animal in Ain Ebel.

Late Modern Period
In January 1837, Ain Ebel was hit by the Galilee earthquake, which devastated the South all the way to Safad and Tiberias.

By the mid-nineteenth century, Ain Ebel had become the principal village of Christianity in the Upper Galilee, and in 1861 it was chosen for the first religious retreat organized in the Holy Land where 55 priests from the archdioceses of Tyre and Acre gathered for a reunion.

Ain Ebel is mentioned in a Christian anthology, containing contributions from ministers and members of various evangelical denominations published in the United Kingdom in 1866:

In 1875 Victor Guérin visited, and noted 800 Maronite and 200 Greek Orthodox villagers.

In 1881, the PEF's Survey of Western Palestine (SWP)  described 'Ain Ibl as a: "Well-built modern village, with a Christian chapel ; contains about 1,000 Christians (800 Maronites and 200 United Greeks). It has vineyards on the slope of the hill on which the village is placed, and olives in the valley below. Good water supply from springs in the valley."

P. Engbert writes that the inhabitants of Ain Ebel offered the Jesuits in 1888 a fairly large lot of land after almost all the inhabitants signed the petition which was presented to R. P. Lefebvre.

In 1889, the village harvest was bad and an epidemic spread among the townspeople, lasting all winter and killing more than fifty people.

French Mandate

By 1920, Ain Ebel had a population of 1,500, living in about 300 houses. That year, while delegates from The Shia Conference of El-Hujair were in Damascus swearing allegiance to King Faisal, an act the Maronites of Jabal Amel considered threatening, Mahmoud Bazzi's gang, which "proceeded from brigandage to confronting France and its Christian friends in the south," attacked Ain Ebel on May 5, 1920, pillaging and killing more than 50 people. The people of Ain Ebel defended the town from sunrise to sunset until they ran out of ammunition  The town was completely destroyed, and the damage done to the two churches, school and convent, were evidence of sectarian malice.  The neighboring villages of Debel and Rmaich were also attacked so after 12 days of plundering and massacres, the French arrived and suppressed all activities in Jabal Amel region The massacres hardened Maronite opinion in favor of Jabal Amel being part of Greater Lebanon, which borders were cemented at the San Remo conference in 1920.

During the French Mandate, the network of paved road expanded, coinciding with the introduction of automobiles in Lebanon. The arrival of the first car in a village became a celebratory event, and this was true in Ain Ebel, where the inhabitants, dressed in their Sunday best, gathered in the church square to welcome the first car to drive through the village. The French planned to build an automobile road to connect the southern villages with those of Mandatory Palestine. The original plan was to build the road from Bint Jbeil via Yaroun and Rmaich, but the people of Ain Ebel protested, knowing the significance of such a road for the development of their town, and in the end, they were able to convince the French government to change the plan and have the road run through the village.

Contemporary History

During World War II, the Vichy French had a line of widely spaced blockhouses that stretched from the coast to the inland heights, reaching Ain Ebel. During the Syria–Lebanon Campaign to liberate Lebanon and Syria from the Vichy, Australian Captain Douglas George Horley was ordered to clear Ain Ebel. Australian Brigadier J. E. S. Stevens decided that he would seize Aitaroun, Bint Jbel, Ain Ebel, Yaroun, Rmaich, Ayta ash Shab, Ramié, Jereine, Aalma ech Chaab and Labouna to cut a road from Al-Malkiyya to the French frontier road so as to make a second gateway into the coastal zone. The Australian squad, guided by Meir Davidson's squad, finally captured the town of Bint Jbeil and the villages of Aitaroun and Ain Ebel.  After taking Yaroun and Bint Jbeil, Ain Ebel was found to have been abandoned by the Vichy.

In the late 1960s and early 1970s, the village was often caught in the skirmishes between the Palestine Liberation Organization and the Israel Defense Force. The Palestine Liberation Organization imposed a food and fuel blockade on Christian villages, such as Ain Ebel and Qlaiaa, forcing the inhabitants to deal with Israel. Christian militia arrived in Ain Ebel and neighboring Christian villages in August 1976 to open a new line of confrontation against the PLO strongholds in neighboring villages, thus jeopardizing the very good relationships that Ain Ebel had with its Muslim neighbors.

In July 2006, Ain Ebel, like other villages that string Lebanon's southern border, such as Debel, Qaouzah, Rmaich, and Yaroun, was caught in the 2006 Lebanon War between Hezbollah and the Israeli army.
The village and its surrounding valleys were used as a military area by Hezbollah.  During the conflict, the village witnessed ferocious battles with missiles destroying many houses and orchards and leaving the townspeople besieged and without bread for three weeks. After allegations that Hezbollah was using humans as shields, the Human Rights Watch visited Ain Ebel on several occasions, and their "investigations revealed that Hezbollah violated the prohibition against unnecessary endangering civilians" when they launched rockets from or near civilian homes, adding that on July 24, around 9:30 am, a convoy of 17 vehicles, fleeing Ain Ebel also came under Israeli  fire, putting civilians under risk and preventing them from leaving the village.

In 2009, there were 410 members of the Lady of the Assumption parish of the Melkite Church in the village.

Geography
Located in the mountainous region of southern Lebanon, known as Belad Bechara in Jabal Amel, or the Lebanese Upper Galilee, Ain Ebel occupies several hills with elevation ranging from 750 to 850 meters above sea level.  There are three natural springs in Ain Ebel, including Tarabnine, Tahta and Hourrié, and in the valley between Ain Ebel and Hanine is Ain Hanine.

Climate

Geology
Deposits of bitumen, a black mixture of hydrocarbons obtained naturally, is found in Ain Ebel. Flint is also found; it was excavated and used to build tools by ancient dwellers of the region.

Vegetation
The main agricultural products are olives, almonds, chestnuts, pecans, grapes, figs, pomegranates, and apples. Oak and pine woods can be found on the outskirts of the village.

Demographics
The people of Ain Ebel are mainly Maronite Catholics, Greek Catholics and Armenian Catholics.

Education

There are three schools in the village: two private schools (Saints-Cœurs and Saint Joseph) and one public school. Of the three, the oldest is Saints-Cœurs, which was established by the Jesuits in 1881.

Within a decade, Ain Ebel had two schools, and Missionary Père Angelil requested the aid of the nuns of Ain Ebel in 1890 to teach for eight days  the inhabitants in neighboring Mi'ilya after which two nuns remained there to manage the new school.

Arts & Culture

Architecture
There are three historic churches, built in the eighteenth and nineteenth century, and a convent that was built in 1857.

Religious Structures

Chapels
 Chapel of the Sacred Heart
 Saint Mary's Chapel

Churches
 Our Lady of Ain Ebel Maronite Catholic Church
 Saint Elie Greek Catholic Melkite Church
 The New Saint Elie Greek Catholic Melkite Church

Convents
 Convent of the Sacred Heart

Shrines
 Saint Charbel Shrine
 Our Lady of Lourdes Monument

Festivals
Each summer, a grand festival is organized in honor of the Blessed Virgin Mary. The festival culminates on the Assumption of Mary on August 15. Outdoor events and open-air concerts are held in the village's square. The festivities peak with a procession of the Virgin Mary icon.

Notables from Ain Ebel

Academia
 Joseph Toufik Khoreich, Author & Prof of Philosophy and Civilization
 Dr. Hiam Sakr, the President of the American University of Science and Technology

Arts
 Francois Diab, author of Le Mirage humain
 Wadih Chbat, author of Constitution of Lebanon: History, Text, Amendments 
 George Diab, actor
 Raimundo Fagner, singer
 Karol Sakr, singer
 Pascale Sakr, singer
 George (Raji) Haddad, singer

Diplomacy
Ambassador Mounir Khoreich

Clergy
 Anthony Peter Khoraich, the late Cardinal, is the most prominent modern figure from Ain Ebel. He was the second Lebanese Patriarch to become cardinal of the Catholic Church.
 Bishop Maroun Sader
 Archimandrite Boulos Samaha
 Monsignor Elie Barakat
 Monsignor Elias Farah
 Father Youssef Farah 
 Father Hanna Haddad
 Sister Therese Haddad
 Monsignor Albert Khoraich 
 Sister Layla Matar
 Clementine Khayat, a Catholic nun from Alep who wrote several articles in the journals, El-Mashriq recounting the events of the massacre of May 5, 1920 that she witnessed.

Journalism
 Jean Diab, who wrote for the Revue du Liban
 Wafai Diab, who was believed to be the first Arabic-language journalist to interview an American President at the White House.
 Nasrat Khoreich, Correspondent for both Annahar and L'Orient Le Jour

Military
 General Maroun Diab
 General Maroun Khoreich

In Literature
 In Half a Lira's Worth: The Life and Times of Vivronia by Mick Darcy
"The Kazzy family, in the early 1920s, were small landholders in the village of Ain Ebel, in Southern Lebanon.

Gallery

References

Bibliography

External links
 https://web.archive.org/web/19990117073503/http://ain-ebel.org/
 https://web.archive.org/web/20090422040334/http://www.khoreich.com/
 https://web.archive.org/web/20061010121040/http://www.ain-ebel.ca/
 https://web.archive.org/web/20071001005424/http://www.fallingrain.com/world/LE/2/Ayn_Ibil.html
 The siege of Ain Ebel
 http://www.ourladyofainebel.org
 Ain Ebel, Localiban
 Survey of Western Palestine, Map 4: IAA, Wikimedia commons

Populated places in Bint Jbeil District
Ain Ebel (Lebanon), Our Lady of Lourdes in
Maronite Christian communities in Lebanon
Melkite Christian communities in Lebanon